Donat is a municipality in the Viamala Region in the Swiss canton of Graubünden. On 1 January 2021 the former municipalities of Casti-Wergenstein, Donat, Lohn and Mathon merged to form the new municipality of Muntogna da Schons.

History
Donat is first mentioned in the middle 12th Century as ad Anede.

Geography
Of this area, 39.9% is used for agricultural purposes, while 51.9% is forested. Of the rest of the land, 2.6% is settled (buildings or roads) and the remainder (5.6%) is non-productive (rivers, glaciers or mountains).

Before 2017, the former municipality was located in the Schams sub-district, of the Hinterrhein district, after 2017 it was part of the Viamala Region.  It is located on the lower Schamserberg, and on the left bank of the Hinterrhein.  It consists of the settlement of Donat and Pazen-Farden.  On 1 January 2003, the municipalities of Donath and Patzen-Fardün merged.  At the same time, the names were converted back to Romansh, with Donath becoming Donat, Patzen became Pazen and Fardün became Farden.  This change occurred as the combined municipality had a majority of Romansh speakers.)

Donat is a linear village with the sections of Curscheglias, Tarvisch and Tscharviof.

Demographics
Donat had a population (as of 2019) of 201. , 5.0% of the population was made up of foreign nationals.  Over the last 10 years the population has decreased at a rate of -1.3%.

, the gender distribution of the population was 43.0% male and 57.0% female.  The age distribution, in Donat is; 20 people or 15.0% of the population are between 0 and 9 years old.  16 people or 12.0% are 10 to 14, and 7 people or 5.3% are 15 to 19.  Of the adult population, 11 people or 8.3% of the population are between 20 and 29 years old.  21 people or 15.8% are 30 to 39, 13 people or 9.8% are 40 to 49, and 13 people or 9.8% are 50 to 59.  The senior population distribution is 11 people or 8.3% of the population are between 60 and 69 years old, 10 people or 7.5% are 70 to 79, there are 10 people or 7.5% who are 80 to 89, and there are 1 people or 0.8% who are 90 to 99.

In the 2007 federal election the most popular party was the SVP which received 52.6% of the vote.  The next three most popular parties were the SPS (25%), the FDP (13.7%) and the CVP (7.3%).

In Donat about 78.1% of the population (between age 25-64) have completed either non-mandatory upper secondary education or additional higher education (either university or a Fachhochschule).

Donat has an unemployment rate of 0.1%.  , there were 56 people employed in the primary economic sector and about 21 businesses involved in this sector.   people are employed in the secondary sector and there are  businesses in this sector.  42 people are employed in the tertiary sector, with 5 businesses in this sector.

The historical population is given in the following table:

Languages
The municipality is almost evenly divided between Romansh- and German-speaking population, with Romansh predominating slightly.  Most of the population speaks Rhaeto-Romance (53.8%), with German  being second most common (41.1%) and Serbo-Croatian being third ( 4.1%).

References

External links
Official Web site

Muntogna da Schons
Former municipalities of Graubünden